A list of the films produced in Mexico in 1971 (see 1971 in film):

See also
1971 in Mexico

References

External links

1971
Films
Mexico